Avatha complens  is a species of moth of the family Erebidae. It is found from the north-eastern Himalayas, the Andamans and Sundaland to the Solomon Islands. The habitat consists of dry, sandy heath forests and lower montane forests.

Adults are highly variable, as well as sexually dimorphic. Both males and females have a distinctly oblique band between the antemedial and postmedial black zones. In males, this band is pale rufous brown, while it is grey in females.

References

Moths described in 1858
Avatha
Moths of Asia